Bhutan is a member of South Asian Zone of the Olympic Council of Asia, and participating in the Asian Games since the Beijing 1990 Games. Bhutan Olympic Committee, established in 1983, and recognized in 1984, is the National Olympic Committee for Bhutan.

Summer Games results

References